Fluf (stylized as fluf) is an American punk rock band formed in San Diego, California, in 1992.

History
O (Otis Barthoulameu - vocals, guitar) and Jonny Donhowe (bass guitar) formed the band after their previous band, Olivelawn, split up, recruiting drummer Miles Gillett. After several seven-inch singles (including a cover version of PJ Harvey's "Sheela Na Gig"), the band's debut album was released in 1993. Generally known as Mangravy, each physical format had a different title. A second album followed in 1994 (Home Improvements, also released on vinyl as Whitey on the Moon and on cassette as Stocking the Lake With Brown Trout), and in 1996 Donhowe left, to be replaced by Josh Higgins. This line-up recorded their major label (MCA) debut Waikiki (1997) and Road Rage (1998), with a final album-length EP, I Know I'm Nobody released in 2000. 

Donhowe died in March 2020.

Barthoulameu died in February 2023.

Discography

Albums
Mangravy (LP) aka Compact Disc is Weak (CD)/Shooting Putty at the Moon (cassette)/Wasting Seed (10" LP) (1993), Headhunter
Home Improvements (CD) aka Whitey on the Moon (LP)/Stocking the Lake With Brown Trout (cassette) (1994), Headhunter
Waikiki (1997), Headhunter/MCA
Road Rage (1998), Honest Don's

Compilation albums
The Classic Years (1995), Headhunter
Super Mixer; A Goldenrod Compilation (1996), Goldenrod

EPs
Wasting Seed (1992), Headhunter Records hed 020
Moody As The Day Is Young! (1994), Goldenrod
I Know I'm Nobody (2000), Cold Steel Facts

Singles
"Garbage Truck" (1992), Sympathy for the Record Industry
"Sheela Na Gig" / "Song In D" (1993), Goldenrod
Split single with Further "Lobster Tree" / "She Lives by the Castle 2" (1993) First Strike Records 
"24-7 Years" (1994), Silver Girl
"Skyrocket" (1994), Headhunter
"Tried" / "Clueless" (1994)  Headhunter HED032
Split single with J Church (1996), Goldenrod: "Assmunch"

References

External links
 

Punk rock groups from California
Musical groups from San Diego